The women's 10 kilometre freestyle at the 2003 Asian Winter Games was held on February 4, 2003 at Ajara Athletic Park, Japan.

Schedule
All times are Japan Standard Time (UTC+09:00)

Results

References

Results FIS

External links
Results of the Fifth Winter Asian Games

Women 10